Ricardo Mejía Hernández (born 24 April 1963) is a Mexican long-distance runner. He was champion of the Skyrunner World Series in 2006 after winning four of the five races in which he participated. In 2009 he placed first in the Irazú SkyRace in Costa Rica.

World Cup wins

References

External links
 Ricardo Mejía results
 Ricardo Mejía profile at Association of Road Racing Statisticians

Living people
Mexican male long-distance runners
Mexican mountain runners
1963 births
Mexican sky runners
World Long Distance Mountain Running Championships winners
21st-century Mexican people